Qaleh Malek or Qaleh-ye Malek may refer to:
 Qaleh Malek, East Azerbaijan
 Qaleh-ye Malek, Isfahan